Manhattan Neighborhood Network (MNN) is an American non-profit organization that broadcasts programming on five public-access television cable TV stations in Manhattan, New York City. The country’s largest community media center, MNN operates two community media centers – in midtown Manhattan and East Harlem – and provides education, equipment, facilities, and programs to community producers and organizations who want to create programming to air on one of MNN's five channels. In 2016, MNN will post more than 5,000 enrollments in their media classes, making one of the largest media education institutions in New York City.

In 2012, MNN opened the MNN El Barrio Firehouse Community Media Center in East Harlem. The El Barrio Firehouse (the former quarters of Engine Company 53) is an intergenerational community media center offering educational programs, community activities, and television production trainings in both English and Spanish. The Firehouse is also home to MNN's Youth Media Center, founded in 2000, which offers education, internships and other opportunities to low-income youth age 15-25 and curates a five-hour block of programming each week.

History
MNN has operated since 1992, and is currently funded as part of a community benefit agreement with Time Warner Cable, Verizon and RCN Corporation, which is tied to their franchise agreements with New York City. Its studios were initially in a rented facility on 23rd Street above ETC/Metro-Access Inc. Studios. It currently operates out of a studio it owns at 537 West 59th Street. In 2002 MNN had two satellite facilities: one on the Lower East Side, a partnership with the Downtown Community Television Center, one of the city's oldest community media centers; and another in East Harlem, a partnership with PRdream.com, also known as MediaNoche, the city's oldest new media gallery based in a community. The relationship with PRdream/MediaNoche ended in 2006. MNN reopened a smaller, temporary operation in an East Harlem, basement storefront on Lexington Avenue.

MNN instituted one of the first community media grant programs in the country, providing video equipment, staff and training for community groups in New York City. This program helped groups to document some of the most historically significant issues of the 1990s and 2000s, including AIDS activism, labor organizing, police brutality, community gardens, immigrants' rights and LGBT rights. MNN ended the grants program in 2008, which triggered a series of events that resulted in the 2019 US Supreme Court case Manhattan Community Access Corp. v. Halleck

From MNN's inception in 1996, it has aimed to serve as a public access station, as well an organizational hub for community media. In addition, MNN producers, staff and community groups led opposition to telecommunications corporations, who the group alleged to be circumventing mandated public obligations to give back to local communities where they run their cable and wires on public streets and land.

The network operates across five channels: MNN1 Community, which chronicles topics from local elections, New York politics and community issues; MNN2 Lifestyle, which explores entertainment about everyday interests from New Yorkers; MNN3 Spirit, which covers spiritual, religious and philosophical matters for various faiths; MNN4 Culture, which  broadcasts multilingual arts-oriented programming from the point of view of Manhattan’s diverse population; and MNN5 HD, a high-definition channel. MNN airs more than 10,000 hours of original local programming each year and broadcasts in more than 40 languages. Several MNN programs have been the recipient of Community Media awards, which are given out each year by the Alliance for Community Media.

MNN also produces the cable and digital channel NYXT.nyc, which debuted online and on the air in 2016. Presented in partnership with more than 60 community-based organizations, NYXT.nyc shines a spotlight on organizations that are working to connect people and build neighborhoods.

See also
 Public-access television
 Culture of New York City

References

External links 

 

American public access television
Television stations in New York City
Television channels and stations established in 1992
1992 establishments in New York City